PTZ may refer to:

Phenothiazine, a chemical insecticide
Petrozavodsk, a city in northwest Russia
Pentylenetetrazol (Metrazol), a circulatory and respiratory stimulant
PTZ camera, capable of pan, tilt, and zoom movement
PTZ, IATA code for Rio Amazonas Airport in Pastaza Province, Ecuador
Pacific Time Zone, name of UTC-8 time zone in the US and Canada
PTZ, "pointz" collected by users of the defunct social commerce site Lockerz
PTZ, pressure (P), temperature (T), and compressibility (Z) of a gas in an equation of state